Joseph Nganga Kiuna is a Kenyan politician. He belongs to the Party of National Unity and was elected to represent the Molo Constituency in the National Assembly of Kenya since the 2007 Kenyan parliamentary election. However he is currently the member of parliament of Njoro Constituency following the split of Molo Constituency.

References

Year of birth missing (living people)
Living people
Party of National Unity (Kenya) politicians
Members of the National Assembly (Kenya)